Vingrom is a village in Lillehammer Municipality in Innlandet county, Norway. The European route E6 highway runs through the village.

References

Lillehammer
Villages in Innlandet
Populated places on the Gudbrandsdalslågen